Yelizaveta is a Russian feminine given name, and is a cognate of Elizabeth. Notable people with the name include:

Grand Duchess Yelizaveta Mikhaylovna of Russia (1826–1845), the second child and daughter of Grand Duke Mikhail Pavlovich of Russia
Yelizaveta Alekseyevna Tarakanova (1753–1775), pretender to the Russian throne
Yelizaveta Belogradskaya (1739 – c. 1764), a Russian Imperial Court opera singer
Yelizaveta Dementyeva (born 1928), Soviet sprint canoeist who competed in the late 1950s
Yelizaveta Kovalskaya (1851 or 1849–1943), Russian revolutionary, narodnik, and founding member of Black Repartition
Yelizaveta Kozhevnikova (born 1973), Russian freestyle skier and Olympic medalist
Yelizaveta Lavrovskaya (1845–1919), Russian mezzo-soprano
Yelizaveta Mironova, Soviet sniper during the Second World War
Yelizaveta Tarakhovskaya (1891–1968), Russian poet, playwright, translator, and author of children's books